Peter O'Meara (born 27 October 1969) is an Irish actor. Known for his work on the London stage he came to the screen in the HBO series Band of Brothers playing the role of Lieutenant Norman Dike. He garnered a popular following on USA TV series Peacemakers as Detective Larimer Finch bringing the science of the future to the old west opposite Tom Berenger as Marshall Jared Stone. For this, he received the Western Heritage Bronze Wrangler award.

O'Meara went on to star on season 4 of Alias as international arms dealer Martin Bishop opposite Jennifer Garner. He has also guest starred on CSI: NY with Gary Sinise, Without a Trace with Anthony La Paglia and The Forgotten with Christian Slater. All three are produced by Jerry Bruckheimer. He recently recurred on the Sky/Cinemax action series Strike Back as Major Brian Donoghue.

O'Meara has appeared in the independent features Haven with Orlando Bloom, Resident Evil: Extinction, with Milla Jovovich and the acclaimed British First World War drama My Boy Jack with Daniel Radcliffe and Carey Mulligan

O'Meara took minor roles in the indie comedy The Grand with Ray Romano and the film Leap Year opposite Amy Adams and John Lithgow.

He is friend to Justin Long in the New Line Cinema hit romantic comedy He's Just Not That Into You playing Bill opposite Ginnifer Goodwin. The CD film soundtrack contains a special extra date scene between the two.

In 2013, O'Meara joined series four of acclaimed award-winning Irish television drama Love/Hate in the role of conflicted dentist Andrew.

He has recurred in the American drama series, NCIS, as Marco Sali head of interpol starting Season 12 in the episode, "The Lost Boys".

References

External links

1969 births
Irish male television actors
Actors from County Tipperary
Living people
Echo Island presenters